Peter Tenganabang Nanfuri (12 October 1942 – 17 February 2023) was a Ghanaian police officer who was the Paramount Chief of the Jirapa Traditional Area with the title Naa Ansoleh Ganaa II. He served as Inspector General of Police (IGP) in Ghana.

Early life and education

Peter Nanfuri was born at Jirapa, a town in the Upper West Region of Ghana. Nanfuri studied at the University of Ghana, Legon, where he obtained B.A. degree in political science and a law degree.

Career

Nanfuri worked in various capacities within the Ghana Police Service. He was once the Director of the Bureau of National Investigation (BNI) 1986 that deals with state security related issues. In 1996, he was appointed the Inspector General of Police. Towards the end of his service as IGP, he came under severe pressure due to the serial murder of some women in Ghana. He was replaced as IGP by John Kufuor, shortly after he became President of Ghana.

Chieftaincy

On 23 July 2005, Peter Nanfuri was enskinned as the 4th Paramount chief of the Jirapa Traditional Area. He was publicly presented in his new capacity at the Naa Yelpoe Park at Jirapa on 28 April 2007. His official or royal name or title was Naa Ansoleh Ganaa II. The first Naa Ansoleh Ganaa, was appointed by the British colonial administration with the stool name of Naa Ansoleh Ganaa I. Nanfuri was his great-grandson. The previous Paramount Chief, Bapereyiri Yelpore, died seven years earlier. Although Nanfuri's father was a chief, he had to contest this position with some cousins.

Death

Nanfuri died on 17 February 2023, at the age of 80.

References

External links

Pictures of former IGPs
Former IGP made chief

1942 births
2023 deaths
Ghanaian Inspector Generals of Police
Ghanaian police officers
Members of the Council of State (Ghana)
University of Ghana alumni
People from Upper West Region